Tetra Cave Natural Monument is a karst cave 1.6 km northwest of  Tskaltubo in Tskaltubo Municipality in Imereti region of Georgia. Locally known as White Cave it is located 140 meters above sea level.

Morphology  
Tetra Cave formed in the Sataphlia-Tskaltubo karst massif.  It is naturally decorated with chalk limestone that provides plenty of white color in cave interior.
Cave has an interesting diversity of old siphon channels.

Fauna 
The inhabitants of the cave are Trachysphaera, Colchidoniscus, Neobisium, Aedes, Dolichopoda, Neelus, Mesogastrura, Pygmarrhopalites, Heteromurus, Lepidocyrtus, Folsomia, Plutomurus, Tegenaria, Carpathonesticus, Archileucogeorgia and Oxychilus.

Health resort 
Cave is hosting  first speleotherapy facility in Georgia. Patients with bronchial asthma and hypertension have been treated here for the past century. Measurements of radon and light ions were conducted inside the cave in  the summer of 2018. Measured value of radon content was 200÷257 Bq/m3 and the summary alpha radioactivity in cave  air was in the range of 600÷771Bq/m3. Measured light ions concentration was 18200÷22250 cm−3 for positive  and  24000÷24280 cm−3 for  negative  ions. Based on these measurements it was concluded that microclimatic, bioclimatic and ionizing conditions in the cave are appropriate for therapeutic purposes.

Archeological site 
Cave is a known important archeological site. Ancient artifacts like pottery remains as well as bones of various animals, such as cave bear, deer, bison, wolf, fox and rabbit, has been found here.

See also 
Speleotherapy

References

Natural monuments of Georgia (country)
Caves of Georgia (country)
Protected areas established in 2011
Geography of Imereti